The Freundlich-Sharonov Basin is a Pre-Nectarian impact basin on the far side of the moon.  It is named after the younger craters Freundlich near the northwest margin and Sharonov near the southwest margin.  It lies east of Mare Moscoviense basin and northwest of Korolev basin.

The basin is not obvious on lunar photographs, although it was discovered from analysis of Lunar Orbiter photographs.  At the center is the small mare Lacus Luxuriae, just south of the oblique crater Buys-Ballot.

Also at the center is a mass concentration (mascon), or gravitational high.  The mascon was first identified by Doppler tracking of the Lunar Prospector spacecraft.

Other craters within the basin include Anderson, Virtanen, Zernike, Dante, and the smaller Šafařík.  Morse and Spencer Jones are at the margins.

Views

References

Impact craters on the Moon
Pre-Nectarian